Cristina Marcos (born 19 December 1963) is a Spanish actress. She has appeared in over 35 films and television shows since 1981. She starred in the 1981 film Maravillas, which was entered into the 31st Berlin International Film Festival.

Selected filmography
 Maravillas (1981)
 High Heels (1991)
 Entre rojas (1995)
 Don't Tempt Me (2001)

External links

1963 births
Living people
Spanish film actresses
Actresses from Barcelona
Spanish television actresses
20th-century Spanish actresses
21st-century Spanish actresses